Mycetophagus obsoletus is a species of hairy fungus beetle in the family Mycetophagidae. It is found in North America.

References

Tenebrionoidea
Articles created by Qbugbot
Beetles described in 1844